Sainte-Marie-des-Champs is a commune in the Seine-Maritime department in the Normandy region in northern France.

Geography
Farming and light industry are the primary occupations.

Population

Places of interest
 The church of St.Marie, dating from the nineteenth century.
 The Chapelle du Fay.

See also
Communes of the Seine-Maritime department

References

Communes of Seine-Maritime